Calum Turner (born 29 April 1999) is a professional rugby league footballer who plays as a  for the Dewsbury Rams in the Betfred Championship.

He has previously played for the Castleford Tigers (Heritage № 983) in the Betfred Super League, and was on loan from Castleford at Featherstone Rovers in the 2019 Betfred Championship.

In 2018 he made his Super League début for the Tigers against Hull FC.

References

External links
Castleford Tigers profile
SL profile
Castleford Tigers youngster Turner earns new deal

1997 births
Living people
Castleford Tigers players
Dewsbury Rams players
English rugby league players
Featherstone Rovers players
Newcastle Thunder players
Rugby league fullbacks
Rugby league players from Castleford